Elgin Caledonian Football Club was a Scottish football team from Elgin, Moray. They participated in the Highland Football League for only one season, in 1900–01, finishing bottom of the league with seven defeats in seven games.

The club was formed in 1892 as a "Junior" outfit. For their first eight years of existence they played most of their home matches at the Public Park (now known as Borough Briggs and home of Elgin City). Some of their big matches were played at Association Park and then Milnfield Park at the time Elgin City's home ground

The "Caley" were a highly successful Junior club in Elgin & District. They won the Elginshire Junior F.A. Cup for its first three seasons of competition. The first in May 1895, when Elgin Wednesday were beaten 3–1 at the Public Park, then again in March 1896, when Elgin Academy were defeated 7–4 at Milnfield Park. The hat-trick was completed in March 1897, when they beat Nairn Thistle 2–1 at Milnfield Park. After a few lean seasons they returned to complete a double in the 1899–1900 term, when they beat Nairn Thistle 5–3 to win the now named Elginshire Matthew F.A. Cup, then won the Nicholson Cup (run on a League basis) for the first time. They then had a somewhat ill-fated spell in the Highland League having replaced Elgin City who had quit the League.

The club reappeared in junior football in 1902. They became founder members of the Elginshire Junior League in early 1906. By the start of the second season (1906–07) it became known as the Morayshire Junior league. The "Caley" taking the title in May 1907 after beating Elgin Thistle in a play-off (replay). They also took the title in 1907–08 season, being unbeaten in their 12 games, with 11 wins and a draw, they also won the Matthew Cup defeating Nairn Thistle in a replayed final in March 1908.

Re-established in 2014, they are currently playing in the Forres and Nairn Welfare league. Caley reignited the local derby with Elgin Thistle on 24 May 2014, but they were beaten 8–0.

References

Defunct football clubs in Scotland
Association football clubs disestablished in 1901
Former Highland Football League teams
1900 establishments in Scotland
1901 disestablishments in Scotland
Elgin, Moray